Oscar Egg (2 March 1890 – 9 February 1961) was a Swiss track and road bicycle racer. He captured the world hour record three times before the First World War and won major road races and stages of the Tour de France and Giro d'Italia. He was also a noted developer of racing bicycles and bicycle components including lugs and derailleurs.

The hour record
Between 1907 and 1914 Oscar Egg and Marcel Berthet improved the hour record six times between them. Egg's 1914 mark of 44.247 km then stood until 1933. Egg set all three of his records at the Vélodrome Buffalo in Paris. The track was a 333m outdoor track surfaced with concrete. The sequence was as follows:
20 Jun 1907, Marcel Berthet, Paris, 41.520 km
22 Aug 1912, Oscar Egg, Paris, 42.122 km
7 Aug 1913, Marcel Berthet, Paris, 42.741 km
21 Aug 1913, Oscar Egg, Paris, 43.525 km
20 Sep 1913, Marcel Berthet, Paris, 43.775 km
18 Aug 1914, Oscar Egg, Paris, 44.247 km

Only Chris Boardman has equaled Egg and Berthet's feat of taking the record three times. The last record, set by Egg in 1914, would stand for nearly 20 years until it was broken in 1933 by	Francis Faure on a Mochet velocar. This caused such a reaction that Faure's achievement was disqualified by the Union Cycliste Internationale (UCI) in 1934.

Racing

Road

1911
Tour de France:
Winner stages 8, 10 and 11 (independents category)
1914
 national road race championship
Paris–Tours
Tour de France:
Winner stages 4 and 5
1917
Milano–Torino
Milano-Modena
1919
Giro d'Italia:
Winner stage 3
Circuit des Champs de Bataille
dropped out in stage 2

Track
Major track victories include:

1914
Six days of Chicago
1915
Six days of Chicago (with Francesco Verri)
1916
Six days of New York (with Marcel Dupuy)
 national track championship
1921
He defeated Alfred Goullet on July 4, 1921 at the Newark Velodrome in Newark, New Jersey Six day race in New York with Piet van Kempen.
Six days of Paris (with Georges Sérès père)
1922
Six Days of Ghent (with Marcel Buysse)
1923
Six days of Paris (with Piet Van Kempen)
Six days of Chicago (with Maurice Brocco)
1924
Six days of Chicago (with Alfred Grenda)
Bol d'Or
1926
 national track sprint championship

Cycling components

Oscar Egg owned a bicycle shop and workshop in Paris, and began manufacturing racing bicycles and components after he retired from racing.

Aerodynamic fairings
Egg tested an aerodynamic fairing in the form of a tail cone on a bicycle labeled the rocket-bike (vélo-fusée in French) in 1913. In response to the success of the Vélo-Vélocar in the 1930s, Egg created a streamlined recumbent in an effort to be the first to travel more than 50 kilometers in a single hour, but he was beaten to it by Francis Faure in an actual Vélo-Vélocar.

Derailleurs
Egg introduced his first derailleur, called Champion, in 1932. It supported as many as 3 different gear ratios and consisted of two parts: a fork mounted near the rear sprocket for moving the chain and a separate tension arm mounted near the front chainring for taking up slack. Shifting gears required back-pedaling. He followed up in 1933 with the Super Champion. It was the official derailleur of the French, Belgian, Spanish, and German Tour de France teams in 1937, the first year that derailleurs were permitted in the race. The device became so popular that more than 1 million were manufactured by 1939.

Egg Super Champion derailleurs were marketed in Britain by the Constrictor Tyre and Accessories Company under the name Osgear.

By the 1950s, fork-type derailleurs, such as the Egg Super Champion, were superseded by double pulley designs, and production ceased before 1960.

Lugs
Egg developed and marketed lugs for the assembly of steel bicycle frames by brazing. Frames exist with decals advertising the fact that they use "Oscar Egg Super Champion Lugs".

Other
Other components bearing Egg's name include brakes, cranks, fork crowns, frames, and hubs.

References

External links

Oscar Egg's palmares at memoire-du-cyclisme.net 
Oscar Egg at the Cycling Hall of Fame
Official Tour de France results for Oscar Egg

UCI official records page

Pictures of Osgear Super Champion derailleurs on various bicycles

1890 births
1961 deaths
Swiss Tour de France stage winners
Swiss male cyclists
People from Winterthur District
Sportspeople from the canton of Zürich